Antonio Hidalgo De Carlos (born 16 February 1943) is a Spanish former professional footballer who played as a forward.

Career
Born in Alfajarín, Hidalgo played for Real Zaragoza, Granada, Calvo Sotelo and Villarreal.

References

1943 births
Living people
Spanish footballers
Association football forwards
Real Zaragoza players
Granada CF footballers
CD Puertollano footballers
Villarreal CF players
La Liga players
Segunda División players